Albania during World War I was an independent state, having gained independence from the Ottoman Empire, on 28 November 1912, following the First Balkan War. It was recognised by the Great Powers as the Principality of Albania, after Turkey officially renounced all its rights in May 1913.  Being a fledgling new country, it quickly unravelled and just a few months after taking power, its German ruler, Prince William of Wied, was forced to flee. After World War I broke out, anarchy took hold of the country as tribes and regions rebelled against central rule. To protect the Greek minority, Greek control was established in the southern districts replacing the Northern Epirote units beginning in October 1914. In response to this, Italy, although officially neutral at the time, also sent troops into the port of Vlorë, while Serbia and Montenegro took control of northern regions. In 1915 Serbia was overrun by combined German, Austro-Hungarian, and Bulgarian forces; the Serbian army retreated across the mountain passes of northern Albania, towards the Adriatic. Italian troops drove the Greeks from southern Albania and brought almost all Albanian territory under their control. Austrian forces invaded in June 1916; Austro-Hungarian forces remained in Albania until the end of the war when a multinational Allied force broke through and pushed them out in 1918.

Background
Albania was a country only created a few years before World War I.  In the aftermath of the Balkan Wars Serbia, Montenegro and Greece all occupied and claimed parts of Albania. It was decided that William of Wied, a German prince would become the leader of the new Principality of Albania. The principality under William of Wied was established on 21 February 1914 and Prince William arrived in Albania at his provisional capital of Durrës on 7 March 1914 along with the royal family. The security of Albania was to be provided by a gendarmerie commanded by Dutch officers.  Inside Albania he was called King William; outside Albania, Prince William.

The southern part of the country, Northern Epirus, which had a large Greek population, grated at being part of Albania and when the Greek soldiers left, it rose up against William. Under pressure from the great powers the Greeks backed down on independence demands and negotiations were carried out on the island of Corfu, where on 17 May 1914 Albanian and Epirote representatives signed an agreement known as the Protocol of Corfu. According to its terms, Northern Epirus would acquire complete autonomous existence (as a corpus separatum) under the nominal Albanian sovereignty of Prince William. The agreement of the Protocol was ratified by the representatives of the Great Powers at Athens on 18 June and by the Albanian government on 23 June.

World War I

Just one month after Protocol of Corfu was signed by the Albanians on June 23, 1914, war broke out in Europe.  Officially starting on July 28, 1914, the war threw Albania into disarray.

Revolt and departure of Prince William

One month after accepting the throne on 7 March, King William arrived in his provisional capital of Durrës and started to organise his government, appointing Turhan Pasha Përmeti to form the first Albanian cabinet. The Muslim uprising in central Albania was one of the factors that led to the Prince's withdrawal from the country and the fall of the so-called six-month kingdom on the eve of the First World War. This first cabinet was dominated by members of the nobility (prince Essad Pasha Toptani, defence and foreign affairs, prince George Adamidi bey Frachery, finances, and prince Aziz pacha Vrioni, agriculture).

His brief reign proved a turbulent one. Immediately following his arrival revolts of Muslims broke out in central Albania against his Chief Minister, Essad Pasha, and against foreign domination. Meanwhile, Greece encouraged the formation of a "provisional government of North Epirus" in the southern part of the country. Although an agreement was made to grant extra rights to the Greek minority, the Hellenic Army occupied Southern Albania excluding Berat and Korçë. William's position was also undermined by his own officials, notably Essad Pasha himself, who accepted money from Italy to finance a revolt and to stage a coup against William. Pasha was arrested on 19 May 1914 and tried for treason and sentenced to death. Only the intervention of Italy saved his life and he escaped to Italy in exile. The outbreak of World War I presented more problems for Prince William as Austria-Hungary demanded that he send Albanian soldiers to fight alongside them. When he refused, citing the neutrality of Albania in the Treaty of London, the remuneration that he had been receiving was cut off.  Various tribal chiefs and self-styled warlords took control of central and northern Albania. In the Greek south, local leaders renounced the Protocol of Corfu and seized control. Prince William left the country on 3 September 1914.

Greek occupation of Northern Epirus (October 1914)

Sporadic armed conflicts continued to occur in spite of the Protocol of Corfu's ratification, and on September 3, 1914, Prince Wilhelm departed the country. In the following days, an Epirote unit launched an attack on the Albanian garrison in Berat without approval from the provisional government, managing to capture its citadel for several days, while Albanian troops loyal to Essad Pasha initiated small-scale armed operations. These events worried Greek Prime Minister Eleftherios Venizelos, as well as the possibility that the unstable situation could spill over outside Albania, triggering a wider conflict. On October 27, 1914, after receiving the approval of the Great Powers the Greek Army's V Army Corps entered the area for a second time. The provisional government of Northern Epirus formally ceased to exist, declaring that it had accomplished its objectives. Greek troops crossed the southern Albanian border at the end of October 1914, officially reoccupying southern Albania, exclusive of Vlorë, and establishing a military administration by 27 October 1914. The Italians were not happy with the Greek occupation and sent in Italian marines to occupy Vlorë, or Avlona, or Vallona, as they called it. On October 31 the Italians seized the strategic island of Saseno or Sazan Island. In December Italy reiterated that Albania would remain neutral as stated at the London Conference and that Italian bluejackets were landed at Avlona with this objective.

Serbian retreat and Austrian occupation (winter 1915)

As anarchy grew in Northern Albania and the Greeks moved into the South, Italy sent its troops to occupy Vlorë while Serbia and Montenegro occupied parts of northern Albania. Successful defensive moves during the Serbian Campaign of World War I kept the Central Powers out of Albania until 1915. Bulgaria was finally coaxed into entering the War on the side of the Central Powers and the Austro-Hungarians and Germans began their attack against Serbia on October 7 while on October 14, 1915, the Bulgarian Army attacked from two directions sending the Serbian armies into disarray.

After attacks from both Bulgaria and Austria, Serbian army leader Marshal Putnik ordered a full retreat, south and west through Montenegro and into Albania. The weather was terrible, the roads poor, and the army had to help the tens of thousands of civilians who retreated with them with almost no supplies or food left. But the bad weather and poor roads worked for the refugees as well, as the Central Powers forces could not press them hard enough, and so they evaded capture. Many of the fleeing soldiers and civilians did not make it to the coast, though – they were lost to hunger, disease, attacks by enemy forces and Albanian tribal bands. The circumstances of the retreat were disastrous, and all told, only some 155,000 Serbs, mostly soldiers, reached the coast of the Adriatic Sea, and embarked on Italian transport ships that carried the army to various Greek islands (many to Corfu) before being sent to Salonika. The evacuation of the Serbian army from Albania was completed on 10 February 1916. In the Serb's wake came the armies of Austria-Hungary and Bulgaria.  They would occupy most of Albania until the Vardar Offensive of September 1918.

Austro-Hungarian occupation of Albania (1916–1918) 
The largest part of Albania was occupied by Austria-Hungary. The Austro-Hungarians left the local administration in place, formed an Albanian gendarmerie and opened schools. The development of a proper Albanian language and orthography was promoted to reduce Italian influences. They also built roads and other infrastructure. Less popular was their attempt to confiscate weapons, which were all-present amongst the civilian population. Nevertheless, several thousand Albanians fought on the side of the Austro-Hungarians against the Allies, including when the Italian Army landed at Durazzo.

The Military Administration was established at Scutari.

Austro-Hungarian Military Commanders were:

 Hermann Kövess von Kövessháza (February 1916 – March 1916), commander of the 3rd Army
 Ignaz Trollmann (March 1916 – October 1917), commander of the XIX Corps
 Ludwig Können-Horák (October 1917 – July 1918), commander of the XIX Corps
 Karl von Pflanzer-Baltin (July 1918 – October 1918), commander of Army Group Albania.

Civil administrator was August Ritter von Kral.

Bulgarian occupation of Albania (1916–1917) 

On December 10, 1915, the Bulgarian army crossed the Drin river, entered Albania, and attacked the positions of the retreating Serbian army. Firstly the Bulgarian army advanced into the valley of river Mat, threatening to capture Shkodra and Lezhë.

There was a rivalry between the Kingdom of Bulgaria and Austria-Hungary in establishing their influence in Albania. Attempting to establish its influence in Albania, Bulgaria allowed Ahmed Zogu to establish his administration in Elbasan and supported him in his attempts to revive support for the regime of Wilhelm of Wied. The double invasion by Austria-Hungary and Kingdom of Bulgaria and a lack of support by the Kingdom of Serbia or Italy, forced Essad Pasha Toptani to leave his proclaimed Republic of Central Albania on February 24, 1916, when he again declared war against Austria-Hungary.

In September 1917 the French troops commanded by general Maurice Sarrail undertook an action against the armies of Austria-Hungary and Bulgaria in Albania. Although the armies of Bulgaria and Austria-Hungary were joined by Albanians, led by Hysejn Nikolica,
French troops captured Pogradec, ending the Bulgarian occupation of Albania.

French and Italian protectorate over Southern Albania (Autumn 1916)
In May 1916, the Italian XVI Corps, some 100,000 men under the command of General Settimio Piacentini, returned and occupied the region of southern Albania by the autumn 1916, while the French army occupied Korçë and its surrounding areas on November 29, 1916.  The Italian (in Gjirokastër) and French forces (in Korçë), according mainly to the development of the Balkan Front, entered the area of former Autonomous Republic of Northern Epirus (controlled by the Greek minority) in autumn 1916, after approval of the Triple Entente.

The establishment of the Autonomous Albanian Republic of Korçë was done on December 10, 1916, by French authorities with a protocol, according to which an autonomous province would be established on the territories of Korçë, Bilishti, Kolonja, Opar and Gora in eastern Albania.

On December 12, 1916, Italy asked for explanations from the Quai d'Orsay, through its ambassador, because the establishment of the Autonomous Albanian Republic of Korçë violated the Treaty of London. Austria-Hungary used French precedent in Korçë to justify the proclamation of independence of Albania under its protectorate on January 3, 1917, in Shkodra.

The Kingdom of Italy did the same when proclaiming independence of Albania under its protectorate on June 23, 1917, in Gjirokastra. General Giacinto Ferrero proclaimed on that day the Italian Protectorate and the next weeks entered Greece and occupied Ioannina in Epirus.  Neither Great Britain nor France had been consulted beforehand, and they did not give any official recognition to the Italian Protectorate. This Albanian republic under the leadership of Turhan Përmeti, protected by 100,000 soldiers of the Italian Army, adopted officially a red flag with a black eagle in the middle, but raised a storm of protests, even in the Italian Parliament.

In autumn 1918, the Italians expanded their Protectorate (without adding anything officially to Albania) to areas of northern Greece (around Kastoria) and western Macedonia (around Bitola), conquered from the Bulgarians and Ottomans. On September 25 the Italian 35th Division reached and occupied Krusevo deep inside western Macedonia.

Macedonian Front (1916–1918)

The Macedonian front, also known as the Salonika Front, of World War I was formed as a result of an attempt by the Allied Powers to aid Serbia.  The Allies were able to move the Serbian Army from Corfu to regions of Greece and Albania where eventually, a stable front was established, running from the Albanian Adriatic coast to the Struma River, pitting a multinational Allied force against the Bulgarian Army, which was at various times bolstered with smaller units from the remaining Central Powers. The Macedonian Front remained quite stable, despite local actions, until the great Allied offensive in September 1918.

In September 1918, Entente forces finally broke through the Central Powers' lines north of Thessaloniki and within days Austro-Hungarian forces began to withdraw from Albania. On October 2, 1918, the city of Durrës was shelled on the orders of Louis Franchet d'Espèrey, during the Battle of Durazzo. According to d'Espèrey, the Port of Durrës, if not destroyed, would have served the evacuation of the Bulgarian and German armies, involved in World War I. When the war ended on 11 November 1918, Italy's army had occupied most of Albania; Serbia held much of the country's northern mountains; Greece occupied a sliver of land within Albania's 1913 borders; and French forces occupied Korçë and Shkodër as well as other regions with sizeable Albanian populations.

Under the secret Treaty of London signed in April 1915, Triple Entente powers promised Italy that it would gain Vlorë (Valona) and nearby lands and a protectorate over Albania in exchange for entering the war against Austria-Hungary. Serbia and Montenegro were promised much of northern Albania, and Greece was promised much of the country's southern half. The treaty left a tiny Albanian state that would be represented by Italy in its relations with the other major powers.

Aftermath

Albania's political confusion continued in the wake of World War I. The country lacked a single recognised government, and Albanians had reasonable fears that Italy, Yugoslavia, and Greece would extinguish Albania's independence and carve up the country. Italian forces controlled Albanian political activity in the areas that they occupied. The Serbs, who largely dictated Yugoslavia's foreign policy after World War I, strove to take over northern Albania, and the Greeks sought to control southern Albania.

In 1918, the Serbian army devastated 150 villages in the Drin valley in northern Albania. There were series of massacres carried out in the regions of Podgor, Rozaj, Gjakova, Rugova, and Gusinje and Plav with the goal of suppressing the local resistance movement.

US President Woodrow Wilson intervened to block the Paris agreement. The United States underscored its support for Albania's independence by recognising an official Albanian representative to Washington, DC, and on December 17, 1920, the League of Nations recognised Albania's sovereignty by admitting it as a full member. The country's borders, however, remained unsettled.

In the meantime, the Italian army had been chased out of Albania by an Albanian volunteer force during the Vlora War (June–September 1920). Instability in the country came to an end when the Parliament abolished the Principality of Albania and proclaimed the Republic, vesting dictatorial powers into the new President Ahmet Zogu.

References

Sources
 
 
 
 
  - Total pages: 416 
 
  - Total pages: 616
 
 
 
 

  - Total pages: 585 
 
  - Total pages: 213 
 
 
  - Total pages: 48 
  - Total pages: 1661 
  - Total pages: 293

Further reading
 Blumi, Isa: Albania, in: 1914-1918-online.  International Encyclopedia of the First World War ed. by Ute Daniel, Peter Gatrell, Oliver Janz, Heather Jones, Jennifer Keene, Alan Kramer, and Bill Nasson, issued by Freie Universität Berlin, Berlin 2014-10-08. 
 Guy, Nicola. (2012). The birth of Albania: ethnic nationalism, the great powers of World War I and the emergence of Albanian independence London, I.B.Tauris
 Tallon, James N. "Albania's Long War, 1912–1925" Studia Historyczne (Volume 4, 2014): 437–455
 Österreichische Staatsarchiv (in German)

External links 
 

1910s in Albania
 
World War I
Macedonian front